The 2006 Copa Indonesia Final was a football match that took place on 16 September 2006 at Gelora Delta Stadium in Sidoarjo. It was the second final of Piala Indonesia and contested by final debutants Persipura Jayapura and title holders Arema Malang. Arema successfully defended their title with a 2–0 win and gained entry to the 2007 AFC Champions League group stage.

Road to the final

Note: In all results below, the score of the finalist is given first (H: home; A: away).

Match details

References

External links
Official site Liga Indonesia

2006
2006–07 in Indonesian football